Cymakra poncei is an extinct species of sea snail, a marine gastropod mollusk in the family Mitromorphidae.

Description
The length of the shell attains 6.5 mm, its diameter 2.4 mm.

Distribution
This extinct marine species was found in Lower Miocene strata of the Chipola Formation in Florida, USA.

References

External links
 Gardner J.A. (1937). The molluscan fauna of the Alum Bluff Group of Florida. Part VI. Pteropoda, Opisthobranchia and Ctenobranchia (in part). United States Geological Survey Professional Paper. 142-F: 251–435, pls 37–48

poncei
Gastropods described in 1937